WMKL (91.9 FM) is a non-commercial radio station broadcasting a Catholic radio format owned by Radio Maria Inc.
Radio Maria USA programming is originated by KJMJ 580 kHz in Alexandria, Louisiana. The station was previously owned by Call Communications Group, Inc.

Call Communications Group, Inc. was formed during the summer of 1994 by a group of college-age young adults in the Miami area.  WMKL was purchased in late 1999 and began broadcasting at 8:05 PM on February 9, 2000.  Call Communications Group owns or operates additional radio stations that serve Southwest Florida, the Glades region, and the Florida Keys. WMKL first broadcast a contemporary Christianmusic format before being sold to Radio Maria USA. Before the transition was made in December 2020, Radio Maria programming was heard on its HD-2 and HD-3 subchannels.

In May 2019, Call Communications announced it would be "phasing out traditional FM radio" in favor of its online operations.

The station signed off its Contemporary Christian format December 22, 2020 at 11:59 pm. At 12 midnight on December 23, Radio Maria USA commenced broadcasting on WMKL's main programming frequency of 91.9.

Radio Maria programming on WMKL in English and Spanish

The bilingual broadcast times on WMKL are:
English: 3AM-3PM
Spanish: 3PM-3AM

Click here for Radio Maria USA Spanish audistream

See also
KJMJ (Originating English language station)

References

External links
 Official Radio Maria USA site (with streaming audio)
 

MKL
Catholic radio stations
Radio stations established in 1999
1999 establishments in Florida